National Association of State Park Directors is an organization dedicated to the preservation of state parks in the United States.

External links 
Official website

Professional associations based in the United States
State parks of the United States
Parks services